Criminal Mind may refer to:

"Criminal Mind" (Lukas Graham song), 2012 song by Danish band Lukas Graham
"Criminal Mind", a song on the album The Crack by The Ruts
Criminal Mind, an album by the band Gone
"Criminal Mind", a song on the album Blue Streak
"Criminal Mind", a song on the album Wolfpack Muzik Vol. 2 by The Pack
"Criminal mind", a song on the album The Boyfriend by Danny Wilde
"A Criminal Mind", a song by Lawrence Gowan
"A Criminal Mind", an episode of the television show Snoops
Criminal Minds, an American crime drama television show
Criminology, and the concepts of mens rea, offender profiling, and forensic psychology
"Enter the Criminal Mind", a song on the album Revenge on Society by Blood for Blood
"Into the Mind of a Killer", an article about criminal psychopathy
"The Criminal Mind", an episode of the television show Lockup
"The World's Greatest Criminal Mind", a song from The Great Mouse Detective and once again on The Adventures of Connor Mclaughlin
The Criminal Personality, Volumes I, II & III (1976, 1977, 1986) and Inside the Criminal Mind (1984), books by Stanton Samenow

See also
Criminal Minds (disambiguation)